Henry S. Elliott (March 26, 1858 – April 22, 1942) was an American attorney and politician who served as the United States Commissioner for the Western District of Washington as a Democrat.

Life

Henry S. Elliott was born on March 26, 1858 to Charlotte Stuart and Stephen Elliott Jr., future Confederate Brigadier General. He graduated from Columbia University and was admitted to the bar in 1879. In 1885 he married Helen Elkhart and later had three children with her.

In 1882 he moved to Wyoming and served as prosecuting attorney of Johnson County for two terms and as mayor of Buffalo for one term. In 1889 he was selected as one of the Democratic delegates to the Wyoming constitutional convention to draft its constitution to be submitted for statehood and served as temporary chairman. In 1891 he left Wyoming and moved to Centralia, Washington and later moved to Seattle in 1910.

On April 13, 1923 he was appointed as United States Commissioner for the Western District of Washington, Northern Divisions and served until March 26, 1942. On April 22, 1942 he died in Seattle, Washington.

References

1858 births
1942 deaths
19th-century American politicians
20th-century American politicians
People from Seattle
Washington (state) Democrats
Wyoming Democrats